Scopula cacuminaria, the frosted tan wave, is a moth of the family Geometridae. The species was first described by Herbert Knowles Morrison in 1874. It is found in North America across southern Canada, from the Maritimes to southern British Columbia, south to Texas.

Adults are on wing in July in Alberta.

The larvae feed on various plants. They have been recorded on lettuce, dandelion and other Asteraceae species.

References

External links

Moths described in 1874
Moths of North America
cacuminaria